(–)-2β-Carboisopropoxy-3β-(4-iodophenyl)tropane (RTI-4229-121, IPCIT) is a stimulant drug used in scientific research, which was developed in the early 1990s. RTI-121 is a phenyltropane based, highly selective dopamine reuptake inhibitor and is derived from methylecgonidine. RTI-121 is a potent and long-lasting stimulant, producing stimulant effects for more than 10 hours after a single dose in mice which would limit its potential uses in humans, as it might have significant abuse potential if used outside a medical setting. However RTI-121 occupies the dopamine transporter more slowly than cocaine, and so might have lower abuse potential than cocaine itself.

Uses 
RTI-121 is mainly used in scientific research into the dopamine reuptake transporter. It is more selective for the dopamine transporter than other DAT radioligands such as β-CIT, and so has less nonspecific binding and produces "cleaner" images. Various radiolabelled forms of RTI-121 (with different radioactive isotopes of iodine used depending on the application) are used in both humans and animals to map the distribution of dopamine transporters in the brain.

Legal status 

RTI-121 not specified as controlled substance in any country as of 2007. Some jurisdictions such as the United States, Australia, and New Zealand, however, might however consider RTI-121 to be a controlled substance analogue of cocaine on the grounds of its related chemical structure.

See also 
 RTI-55
 List of cocaine analogues
 List of Phenyltropanes

References 

Iodoarenes
Tropanes
RTI compounds
Dopamine reuptake inhibitors
Sympathomimetic amines
Medical imaging
Neuroimaging